Rebecca Womersley (born 6 March 1993) is an English former professional racing cyclist who last rode for . She is the granddaughter of racing cyclist Brian Robinson and sister of cyclist Jake Womersley.

See also
 List of 2016 UCI Women's Teams and riders

References

External links
 
 

1993 births
Living people
English female cyclists
Place of birth missing (living people)